Iberus campesinus is a species of gastropods belonging to the family Helicidae.

The species is found in Spain.

Per IUCN, the species has the status "vulnerable".

References

campesinus
Gastropods described in 1846